WMGR (930 AM) is a Christian radio station broadcasting a Contemporary Christian music format. Licensed to Bainbridge, Georgia, United States, the station serves the Tallahassee area.  The station was owned by Kevin Dowdy, through licensee Flint Media Inc. prior to purchase by Clear Channel Communications.

History
WMGR was established in the late 1940s by Marvin Griffin, who later became the 72nd Governor of Georgia.  The call sign was for Marvin Griffin Radio.

On January 1, 2017, WMGR changed their format from classic hits to contemporary Christian.

Previous logo

References

External links

Radio stations established in 1943
MGR